Scopula caesaria  is a moth of the  family Geometridae. It has a wide range, including the Comoros, Mayotte, La Réunion, Madagascar and in Mauritius, Nigeria, South Africa, Tanzania, Gambia, Oman, the United Arab Emirates, New Guinea, Taiwan, Japan and Australia (Queensland).

Adults of have brown wings with red zigzag markings.

Subspecies
Scopula caesaria caesaria
Scopula caesaria walkeros Wiltshire, [1981] (Oman, United Arab Emirates)

References

Moths described in 1861
caesaria
Moths of Africa
Moths of Asia
Moths of Australia